This is the discography of the American house music group Masters at Work.

Charted singles 
As of 2017, Masters at Work singles have reached the Billboard Dance Club Songs chart on four occasions.

Discography

Albums
1993 The Album
1995 The Essential KenLou House Mixes
1997 Nuyorican Soul (as Nuyorican Soul)
1998 The Remixes (as Nuyorican Soul)
2000 The Tenth Anniversary Collection - Part I
2000 The Tenth Anniversary Collection - Part II
2001 Our Time is Coming

Singles

Masters at Work
1991: "Blood Vibes/The Ha Dance"
1991: "Our Mute Horn" (with Ray Vega)
1991: "69 Steps"
1992: "Gonna Get Back to You" (with Xaviera Gold)
1993: "Can't Stop the Rhythm" (with Jocelyn Brown)
1993: "Give It to Me" (with Screechie Dan)
1993: Hardrive EP
1993: "I Can't Get No Sleep" (with India)
1993: "When You Touch Me" (with India)
1994: "Get Up"
1995: "I Can't Get No Sleep '95" (with India) - UK #44
1997: "La India Con la Voe" (with India and Albert Menendez)
1997: "MAW Sampler"
1997: "To Be in Love" (with India)
1998: "Odyssey/I'm Ready"
1998: "Pienso en Ti" (with Luis Salinas)
1999: "To Be in Love '99" (with India) - UK #23
1999: "MAW Expensive" (as MAW presents a Tribute to Fela, with Ibi Wunmi)
2000: "Brazilian Beat" (with Liliana Chachian)
2000: "Ékabo"
2000: MAW Unreleased Mixes
2001: "Lean on Me" (with James Ingram)
2001: "Dubplate Special 1"
2001: "Like a Butterfly" (with Patti Austin)
2001: "Work" (with Puppah Nas-T and Denise Belfon)
2001: "Dubplate Special 2"
2002: "Backfired" (with India) - UK #62
2003: "Dubplate Special 3"
2006: "Loud" (with Beto Cuevas)
2007: "Work 2007" (with Puppah Nas-T and Denise Belfon) - UK #81

Nuyorican Soul
1993 "The Nervous Track"
1996 "Mind Fluid"
1996 "Runaway" (with India)
1996 "You Can Do It (Baby)" (with George Benson)
1997 "I Am the Black Gold of the Sun" (with Jocelyn Brown)
1997 "It's All Right, I Feel it" (with Jocelyn Brown)
1998 "I Love the Nightlife" (with India)

KenLou
1995 "Moonshine/Hillbilly Song"
1995 "The Bounce/Gimme Groove"
1995 "What a Sensation" (with India)
1996 "MAW War/Mack Daddy Shoot"
1997 "Thru the Skies"
1998 "Bangin'"
2001 "Gone Three Times"
2003 "Where Did It Go" (Bryan Ford guitar)

Groove Box
1996 "Casio's Theme/The More You Want"
1996 "Just Be Good to Me" (with Leena Marie)
2000 "I'm Your Man"
2001 "The More You Want"

Other aliases
1994 "Voices in my Mind", as Voices (with India)
1994 "My Love", as People Underground (with Michael Watford)
1995 "The Hard Times March", as 200 Sheep
1995 "The Drum", as WAM
1997 "Dance (Do That Thang)", as Black Magic
1997 "Let it Go", as Black Magic
2002 "Tranz/Body", as MAW Electronic
2004 "Danz/Time Travellers", as MAW Electronic

Productions for other artists
1993 Freedom Williams - "Voice of Freedom"
1994 Barbara Tucker - "Beautiful People"
1994 Willi Ninja - "Hot"
1997 Byron Stingily - "Flying High"
1999 Robyn - "Main Thing", "Good Thang"
1999 Will Smith - "La Fiesta", with Keith Pelzer and Jeff Townes
2001 Jody Watley - "I Love to Love"
2001 Aaliyah - "More Than A Woman"
2005 Anané feat. Mr. V - "Let Me Love You"
2005 Anané & Mr. V - "Move, Bounce, Shake"

Mixed compilations
 1995 Ministry of Sound Sessions 5
 2001 West End Records: The 25th Anniversary Mastermix
 2004 Defected Presents: Masters at Work - In The House
 2005 The Kings of House
 2006 Soul Heaven Presents: Masters at Work
 2007 Ministry of Sound Chillout Classics
 2007 Strictly MAW
 2014 Defected Presents House Masters - Masters At Work
 2015 Defected Presents House Masters - Masters At Work - Volume Two

Selected remixes
 1990 Debbie Gibson - "One Step Ahead"
 1991 Michael Jackson - "Don't Stop Till You Get Enough"
 1992 Chic - "Chic Mystique"
 1992 Vanessa Williams - "Work To Do"
 1992 CeCe Peniston - "Crazy Love"
 1992 Desiya - "Comin' On Strong"
 1992 Michael Jackson - "Rock with You"
 1992 Madonna - "Erotica"
 1992 Lisa Stansfield - "Time to Make You Mine"
 1992 Lisa Stansfield - "Set Your Loving Free"
 1993 Debbie Gibson - "Losin' Myself"
 1993 Jamiroquai - "Emergency on Planet Earth"
 1994 Secret Life - "Borrowed Time"
 1994 Barbara Tucker - "Beautiful People"
 1994 Björk - "Violently Happy"
 1995 Donna Summer - "I Feel Love"
 1997 The Braxtons - "The Boss"
 1997 George Benson - "Song For My Brother"
 1997 George Benson - "Baby I'm In Love"
1997 Daft Punk - "Around The World"
 1998 Janet Jackson - "Go Deep"
 1998 Melanie B feat. Missy Elliott - "I Want You Back"
 1999 Gus Gus - "VIP"
 1999 Janet Jackson - "Ask for More"
 2000 The Beatles - "Get Back"
 2000 Nina Simone - "See Line Woman"
 2000 Spice Girls - "Holler"
 2001 Aaliyah - "More Than a Woman"
 2004 Stephanie Mills - "Free- Louie Vega Mix"
 2004 4Hero - "The Remix Album, Vol.1"
 2014 Donna Summer - "Last Dance"

References

Discographies of American artists
House music discographies
Electronic music group discographies